William Horn Battle (1802–1879) was a North Carolina jurist and law professor who served on the North Carolina Supreme Court. He was also the father of Kemp P. Battle.

Battle was born in Edgecombe County, North Carolina and educated at the University of North Carolina at Chapel Hill. He became a lawyer after studying under Chief Justice Leonard Henderson. Battle also served as court reporter for the state Supreme Court, a member of the North Carolina House of Commons representing Franklin County, delegate to the 1839 Whig National Convention, and a state superior court judge. He also taught at the University of North Carolina School of Law between 1845 and 1866.  Among his students were future Gov. Zebulon B. Vance and future state Supreme Court justices Joseph J. Davis, James E. Shepherd, and Walter Clark.

Battle was appointed to serve on the state Supreme Court by Governor William Alexander Graham in 1848 until the legislature could meet to select a replacement for Judge Joseph J. Daniel. The legislators did not elect Battle to continue in office at this time, but they chose him to fill a seat on the court in 1852. He served on the Supreme Court until 1868, when he returned to the practice of law. 
Battle later served as president of a bank and as Dean of the UNC Law School from 1877 until his death (while his son served as president of the university).

Battle is buried in Historic Oakwood Cemetery.

References

North Carolina Reports, NC Supreme Court (1919)
Historic Oakwood Cemetery

1802 births
1879 deaths
Burials at Historic Oakwood Cemetery
Justices of the North Carolina Supreme Court
Members of the North Carolina House of Representatives
University of North Carolina School of Law faculty
North Carolina Whigs
19th-century American politicians
U.S. state supreme court judges admitted to the practice of law by reading law